The Long Low-Wing Longster is an American aircraft that was designed by Leslie Long, for homebuilt construction.

Design and development
The Low-Wing Longster is a single place, wire braced, low wing, open cockpit aircraft with conventional landing gear. The lower wing wire bracing is connected to the landing gear. The root wing ribs are oversized to create a smooth wing to fuselage fillet.

The aircraft was the last in a series of homebuilt aircraft designs from Les Long. In 1935, the American Bureau of Aviation restricted homebuilt construction of aircraft. A small group of Oregon-based homebuilders were the last hold-outs. The Private Flying Association was developed to promote experimental aircraft and they made the Longster the official aircraft design.

Operational history
In 1947, a  variant called the "Little Gee Bee" was built and flown by George Brogardus from Oregon to Washington D.C. to demonstrate to the C.A.A. that homebuilt aircraft were safe and restrictions should be lifted on building them.

Specifications (Low-Wing Longster)

See also

References

External links
 Longster fuselage image

Homebuilt aircraft